In mathematics, a parent function is the core representation of a function type without manipulations such as translation and dilation. For example, for the family of quadratic functions having the general form

the simplest function is
.
This is therefore the parent function of the family of quadratic equations.

For linear and quadratic functions, the graph of any function can be obtained from the graph of the parent function by simple translations and stretches parallel to the axes. For example, the graph of y = x − 4x + 7 can be obtained from the graph of y = x by translating +2 units along the X axis and +3 units along Y axis. This is because the equation can also be written as y − 3 = (x − 2).

For many trigonometric functions, the parent function is usually a basic sin(x), cos(x), or tan(x). For example, the graph of y = A sin(x) + B cos(x) can be obtained from the graph of y = sin(x) by translating it through an angle α along the positive X axis (where tan(α) = ), then stretching it parallel to the Y axis using a stretch factor R, where R = A + B. This is because A sin(x) + B cos(x) can be written as R sin(x−α) (see List of trigonometric identities).

The concept of parent function is less clear for polynomials of higher power because of the extra turning points, but for the family of n-degree polynomial functions for any given n, the parent function is sometimes taken as x, or, to simplify further, x when n is even and x for odd n.  Turning points may be established by differentiation to provide more detail of the graph.

See also 
 Curve sketching

References

External links 
 Video explanation at VirtualNerd.com

Curves
Elementary algebra
Functions and mappings